Santa Monica High School Girls Track team first coach is Dalal M. Ahmad, a USC graduate doing her second semester of student student teaching .  She was placed in charge of the team in 1972 during her second semester of student teaching
The Santa Monica Track Club (also known as SMTC) was formed Joe Douglas as a post-collegiate track .  By the 1980s, the team came to be a major player in worldwide Track and Field competition, with team members setting numerous World and National records.  The membership list reads like a Who's Who of Olympic athletes and the SMTC logo became a recognizable icon on the uniforms of those elite athletes.

History
In its first year of existence, 1968 Olympian from Puerto Rico, Willie Rios joined the club and qualified to run in the 1972 Summer Olympics.  In 1974, member Reid Harter set the first American Record in the road 30 Kilometre run.  By 1976, three team members qualified for the 1976 Summer Olympics.

In 1979, a young Carl Lewis, then known as a top level High School long jumper, joined the club for competitions beyond his collegiate career at the University of Houston.  Lewis went on to be the dominant force in sprinting and long jump for the next decade.  Coached in the off season by his collegiate coach Tom Tellez, other elite sprinters were attracted to the club, including Carol Lewis, Carl's sister and University of Houston teammates Joe DeLoach, Leroy Burrell and Kirk Baptiste.  The club developed an impressive record of Olympic and World Championships, limited in many situations because teammates were the closest competition at the highest level.  Lewis and Burrell exchanged the prestigious World Record in the 100 metres four times.

Four members of the club, Michael Marsh, Leroy Burrell, Floyd Heard and Carl Lewis, representing the Santa Monica Track Club tied the world record in the 4x100 meters relay at the Herculis meet in Monaco.  The record lasted for four days until it was surpassed by a team representing the USA that consisted of three of the SMTC members, with Dennis Mitchell replacing Heard.  The same four members set the World Record in the 4 x 200 metre relay, set at the Mt. SAC Relays in 1994.  That record lasted over 20 years until it was surpassed by .05 by a team from Jamaica at the 2014 IAAF World Relays.   Also Kevin Young's World Record in the 400 metre hurdles set in winning the 1992 Summer Olympics stood until 1 July 2021.

The club was elected into the Mt. SAC Relays Hall of Fame in 2011.

Foundation
The club is funded through the Santa Monica Track Club Foundation, founded by Ed Stotsenberg (who had the personalized license plate SMTC 1), an early Masters runner who joined the club in the mid-1970s and became its president.

Notable members

 Kirk Baptiste - 1 Olympic medal
Leroy Burrell - 1 Olympic Gold Medal, 2 World Championship Gold Medals, 2 time World Record holder 100 metres
 Cletus Clark
 Brian Cooper
Christian Cushing-Murray
Joe DeLoach - 1 Olympic Gold Medal
Jean Destine - 1996 Olympian
Mike Durkin
Danny Everett - 1 Olympic Gold Medal, 1 Bronze, 1 World Championship Gold Medal
Gary Fanelli - 1988 Olympic Games Marathon , a member of SMTC,1973 and 1974
Michelle Finn-Burrell - 1 Olympic Gold Medal
Johnny Gray - 1 Olympic medal, current United States record 800 metres
Todd Harbour
Reid Harter
Floyd Heard
Mihály Iglói
Bayano Kamani
Felix Kitur
Carl Lewis - 9 Olympic Gold Medals, 1 Silver, 8 World Championship Gold Medals, 3 time World Record holder 100 metres
Carol Lewis - 1 World Championship Bronze medal
Steve Lewis - 3 Olympic Gold Medals, 1 Silver
André Action Jackson
Khadevis Robinson
Lewis Johnson
Earl Jones - 1 Olympic medal
Jerald Jones
Jeff Jirele
George Kersh
David Mack
Mike Marsh- 2 Olympic Gold Medals, 1 Silver, 1 World Championship Gold Medal
Bill McChesney
Mark McNeil
Dennis Mitchell
Prince Mumba
McClinton Neal
Willie Ríos
LaMont Smith - 1 Olympic Gold medal
Jenny Spangler
Henry Thomas
Delisa Walton-Floyd
Mark Witherspoon
Kevin Young  - 1 Olympic Gold Medal, 1 World Championship Gold Medal, former World Record holder 400 metre hurdles

References

External links
 Official Santa Monica Track Club website

Running clubs in the United States
Track and field clubs in the United States
Sports in Santa Monica, California
Sports teams in Los Angeles
Clubs and societies in the United States
Athletics clubs in the United States
Track and field in California
1972 establishments in California
Organizations based in Santa Monica, California